Giannis Argyris (1918 – 23 July 1993) was a Greek actor. He appeared in a number of films from 1951 to 1992.

Filmography

References

External links 

1918 births
1993 deaths
Greek male film actors
People from Boeotia